The Boeing 737 MAX is the fourth generation of the Boeing 737, a narrow-body airliner manufactured by Boeing Commercial Airplanes (BCA), a division of American company Boeing. It succeeds the Boeing 737 Next Generation (NG) and competes with the Airbus A320neo family.

The new series was announced on August 30, 2011. It took its maiden flight on January 29, 2016 and was certified by the United States Federal Aviation Administration (FAA) in March 2017. The first delivery was a MAX 8 in May 2017 to Malindo Air, with which it commenced service on May 22, 2017.

The 737 MAX is based on earlier 737 designs, with more efficient CFM International LEAP-1B engines, aerodynamic changes, including distinctive split-tip (Scimitar) winglets, and airframe modifications.

The 737 MAX 7, MAX 8 (including the 200–seat MAX 200), and MAX 9 are intended to replace the 737-700, -800, and -900 respectively, and a further-stretched 737 MAX 10 is available. , the 737 MAX has 4,246 unfilled orders and 1,068 deliveries.

The 737 MAX suffered a recurring failure in the Maneuvering Characteristics Augmentation System (MCAS), causing two fatal crashes, Lion Air Flight 610 and Ethiopian Airlines Flight 302, in which 346 people died in total.  It was subsequently grounded worldwide from March 2019 to November 2020.  The FAA garnered criticism for defending the aircraft and was the last major authority to ground it. Investigations faulted a Boeing cover-up of a defect and lapses in the FAA's certification of the aircraft for flight. Boeing paid  in penalties and compensation to settle the DOJ's fraud conspiracy case against the company. Further investigations also revealed that the FAA and Boeing had colluded on recertification test flights, attempted to cover up important information and that the FAA had retaliated against whistleblowers.

The FAA cleared the return to service on November 18, 2020, subject to mandated design and training changes. Canadian and European authorities only followed in late January 2021, and Chinese authorities in December 2021, as over 180 countries out of 195 had lifted the grounding. Over 450 MAX aircraft were awaiting delivery in November 2020; 335 remained by January 2022. Boeing estimated that the backlog would be largely cleared by the end of 2023, after its order book was reduced by almost 1,000 aircraft due to cancellations from loss of trust in the aircraft.

Development

Background 
In 2006, Boeing started considering the replacement of the 737 with a "clean-sheet" design that could follow the Boeing 787 Dreamliner. In June 2010, a decision on this replacement was postponed into 2011.

On December 1, 2010, Boeing's competitor, Airbus, launched the Airbus A320neo family to improve fuel burn and operating efficiency with new engines: the CFM International LEAP and the Pratt & Whitney PW1000G. In February 2011, Boeing's CEO Jim McNerney maintained "We're going to do a new airplane." In March 2011, BCA President James Albaugh told participants of a trade meeting the company was not sure about a 737 re-engine, like Boeing CFO James A. Bell stated at an investor conference the same month. The Airbus A320neo gathered 667 commitments at the June 2011 Paris Air Show for a backlog of 1,029 units since its launch, setting an order record for a new commercial airliner.

On July 20, 2011, American Airlines announced an order for 460 narrowbody jets including 130 A320ceos (Current Engine Option), 130 A320neos, 100 737NG and intended to order 100 re-engined 737s with CFM LEAPs, pending Boeing confirmation. The order broke Boeing's monopoly with the airline and forced Boeing into a re-engined 737. As this sale included a Most-Favoured-Customer Clause, Airbus has to refund any difference to American Airlines if it sells to another airline at a lower price, so the European manufacturer was unable to offer it at a price which United Airlines deemed to be "competitive" leaving the airline with a Boeing-skewed fleet.

Program launch 

On August 30, 2011, Boeing's board of directors approved the launch of the re-engined 737, expecting a 4% lower fuel burn than the Airbus A320neo. Studies for additional drag reduction were performed during 2011, including revised tail cone, natural laminar flow nacelle, and hybrid laminar flow vertical stabilizer. Boeing abandoned the development of a new design. Boeing expected the 737 MAX to meet or exceed the range of the Airbus A320neo. Firm configuration for the 737 MAX was scheduled for 2013.

In March 2010, the estimated cost to re-engine the 737, according to Mike Bair, Boeing Commercial Airplanes' vice president of business strategy and marketing, would be , including the CFM engine development. Bernstein Research predicted in January 2012, that this cost would be twice that of the A320neo. Fuel consumption is reduced by 14% from the 737NG. Southwest Airlines was signed up as the launch customer in 2011.

In November 2014, McNerney said the 737 would be replaced by a new airplane by 2030—probably using composite materials—that would be slightly bigger and have new engines, but would retain the 737's general configuration.

Production 

On August 13, 2015, the first 737 MAX fuselage completed assembly at Spirit Aerosystems in Wichita, Kansas, for a test aircraft that would eventually be delivered to launch customer Southwest Airlines. On December 8, 2015, the first 737 MAX—a MAX 8 named Spirit of Renton—was rolled out at the Boeing Renton Factory.

Because GKN could not produce the titanium honeycomb inner walls for the thrust reversers quickly enough, Boeing switched to a composite part produced by Spirit to deliver 47 MAXs per month in 2017. Spirit supplies 69% of the 737 airframe, including the fuselage, thrust reverser, engine pylons, nacelles, and wing leading edges.

A new spar-assembly line with robotic drilling machines was expected to increase throughput by 33%. The Electroimpact automated panel assembly line sped up the wing lower-skin assembly by 35%. Boeing planned to increase its 737 MAX monthly production rate from 42 planes in 2017, to 57 planes by 2019. The new spar-assembly line is designed by Electroimpact. Electroimpact has also installed fully automated riveting machines and tooling to fasten stringers to the wing skin.

The rate increase strained the production and by August 2018, over 40 unfinished jets were parked in Renton, awaiting parts or engine installation, as CFM engines and Spirit fuselages were delivered late. After parked airplanes peaked at 53 at the beginning of September, Boeing reduced this by nine the following month, as deliveries rose to 61 from 29 in July and 48 in August.

On September 23, 2015, Boeing announced a collaboration with Comac to build a completion and delivery facility for the 737, in Zhoushan, China, the first outside the United States. This facility initially handles interior finishing only, but will subsequently be expanded to include paintwork. The first aircraft was delivered from the facility to Air China on December 15, 2018.

Flight testing and certification 

The first flight took place on January 29, 2016, at Renton Municipal Airport, nearly 49 years after the maiden flight of the original 737-100, on April 9, 1967. The first MAX 8, 1A001, was used for aerodynamic trials: flutter testing, stability and control, and takeoff performance-data verification, before it was modified for an operator and delivered. 1A002 was used for performance and engine testing: climb and landing performance, crosswind, noise, cold weather, high altitude, fuel burn and water-ingestion. Aircraft systems including autoland were tested with 1A003. 1A004, with an airliner layout, flew function-and-reliability certification for 300 hours with a light flight-test instrumentation.

The 737 MAX gained FAA certification on March 8, 2017, and in the same month was approved by EASA on March 27, 2017. After completing 2,000 test flight hours and 180-minute ETOPS testing requiring 3,000 simulated flight cycles in April 2017, CFM International notified Boeing of a possible manufacturing quality issue with low pressure turbine (LPT) discs in LEAP-1B engines. Boeing suspended 737 MAX flights on May 4, and resumed flights on May 12.

During the certification process, the FAA delegated many evaluations to Boeing, allowing the manufacturer to review their own product. It was widely reported that Boeing pushed to expedite approval of the 737 MAX to compete with the Airbus A320neo, which hit the market nine months ahead of Boeing's model.

Entry into service 

The first delivery was a MAX 8, handed over to Malindo Air (a subsidiary of Lion Air) on May 16, 2017; it entered service on May 22. Norwegian Air International was the second airline to put a 737 MAX into service, when it performed its first transatlantic flight with a MAX 8 named Sir Freddie Laker on July 15, 2017, between Edinburgh Airport in Scotland and Bradley International Airport in the U.S. state of Connecticut.

Boeing aimed for 737 MAX to match the 99.7% dispatch reliability of the 737 Next Generation (NG). Southwest Airlines, the launch customer, took delivery of its first  on August 29, 2017. Boeing planned to deliver at least  to  aircraft in 2017, 10–15% of the more than five hundred 737s to be delivered in the year.

Grounding and recertification 

In 2019, the Boeing 737 MAX was grounded worldwide after a malfunctioning flight control system caused two new aircraft to crash in Indonesia (Lion Air Flight 610 on October 29, 2018) and Ethiopia (Ethiopian Airlines Flight 302 on March 10, 2019), killing all 346 people on board both flights. China became the first air authority to ground the aircraft on March 11, 2019, setting a worldwide precedent as Singapore, India, Turkey, South Korea, the European Union, Australia and Malaysia followed the next day. The United States Federal Aviation Administration was one of the last to ground the aircraft, defending against groundings by issuing a Continued Airworthiness Notice to operators on March 11, garnering widespread controversy before finally grounding it on March 13, 2019. Investigations faulted a Boeing cover-up of a defect and lapses in the FAA's certification of the aircraft for flight. Further investigations also revealed that the United States Federal Aviation Administration and Boeing had colluded on recertification test flights, attempted to cover up important information and that the FAA had retaliated against whistleblowers.

In the twenty months during the grounding, Boeing redesigned the computer architecture that supported the Maneuvering Characteristics Augmentation System (MCAS) while investigations faulted aircraft design and certification lapses. Flawed information from a single external sensor fed into the system caused it to repeatedly push the planes' noses down as pilots struggled to keep them in the air before both crashes. Boeing faces legal and financial consequences, as no deliveries of the MAX could be made while the aircraft was grounded, and airlines canceled more orders than Boeing produced during this period. Boeing found foreign object debris in the fuel tanks of 35 of 50 grounded 737 MAX aircraft that were inspected, and had to check the remainder of the 400 undelivered planes. Boeing had similar problems with 787s produced in South Carolina. The FAA curtailed Boeing's delegated authority and invited global aviation stakeholders to comment on pending changes to the aircraft and to pilot training. The FAA lifted its grounding order in 2020; all aircraft must be repaired to comply with various airworthiness directives.

After being charged with fraud in connection of both crashes of the 737 MAX, Boeing settled by paying over $2.5 billion: a criminal monetary penalty of $243.6 million (10%), $1.77 billion in damages to airline customers (70%), and $500 million to a crash-victim beneficiaries fund (20%). In April 2022, families of U.S. crash victims began petitioning a U.S. federal judge in Texas to scrap the settlement and reopen the criminal case, arguing that the U.S. Department of Justice (USDOJ) violated the Crime Victims' Rights Act in settling without consulting with the families, and that the USDOJ should not have agreed to shield senior Boeing executives from prosecution. USDOJ prosecutors assert that the settlement is lawful because it cannot be proven that a crime was committed against the crash victims. On January 20, 2023, a U.S. district court judge ordered Boeing to appear at a January 26 arraignment to discuss whether the company should face a felony charge of criminal conspiracy in the case.

Production slowdown and suspension 
From mid-April 2019, Boeing announced that it was temporarily cutting production of the 737 aircraft from 52 per month to 42 amid the 737 MAX groundings.
Production of the LEAP-1B engine continued at an unchanged rate, enabling CFM to catch up its backlog within a few weeks.
As the 737 MAX recertification moved into 2020, Boeing suspended production from January to conserve cash and prioritize stored aircraft delivery. The 737 MAX program was the company's largest source of profit.
After the announcement, Moody's cut Boeing's debt ratings in December, citing the rising costs due to the grounding and the production halt including financial support to suppliers and compensation to airlines and lessors which could lower the program's margins and cash generation for years. The rating agency also warned that the production halt would have wide and harmful impact to the whole aerospace and defense supply chain and the ramp-up would be slower than previously anticipated.
CFM International reduced production of the LEAP-1B for the 737 MAX, in favor of the LEAP-1A for the Airbus A320neo, but was prepared to meet demand for both aircraft.

Boeing did not publicly say how long the suspension would last. The last pre-suspension fuselages entered final assembly in early January 2020. Boeing was reported to internally expect production to be halted for at least 60 days. Industry observers began to question if Boeing's projection of record production rate of 57 per month would ever be reached. In early April, the COVID-19 pandemic led Boeing to shut down its other airliner production lines and further delayed recertification of the MAX.

Recertification and return to service 

In early January 2020, an issue was discovered in the MAX software update, which impacted its recertification effort. As of mid-January, Boeing expected the MAX to return to service by mid-2020. In late April, following the COVID-19 pandemic, Boeing then hoped to win regulatory approval by August 2020. Between June 29 and July 1, the FAA and Boeing conducted a series of recertification test flights. Transport Canada and EASA each concluded their own independent recertification flights in late August and early September. On November 18, the FAA announced that the MAX had been cleared to return to service. Before individual aircraft could resume service, repairs were required as set out in an airworthiness directive from the FAA. Airline training programs also required approval.

On December 3, American Airlines made a demonstration flight for journalists to explain the FAA-required modifications, to regain public trust. The first airline to resume regular passenger service was Brazilian low-cost Gol on December 9. The first in the United States was American Airlines on December 29.

Transport Canada and EASA both cleared the MAX in late January 2021, subject to additional requirements. Other regulators worldwide progressively ungrounded the aircraft, including those in the UAE, Australia, Kenya, and Brazil. The Indian Directorate General of Civil Aviation (DGCA) rescinded its ban on MAX airplanes in late August on the condition that they meet the requirements set by the FAA and EASA. China's civil aviation regulator (CAAC) cleared the 94 jets stored by 11 carriers in China to fly again in December 2021. Deliveries of approximately  planes stored by Boeing resumed in early 2022, with over 180 countries out of 195 having lifted the grounding. However, EASA forbade airlines from performing RNP AR approaches with the MAX.

Production ramp-up and recovery 
In late January 2020, production was expected to restart in April and take a year and a half to clear the inventory of 400 airplanes, ramping up slowly and building over time: Boeing might have delivered 180 stored jets by year-end and produce an equal number. Boeing did not disclose any possible effect on deliveries caused by the FAA's withdrawal of Boeing's delegated authority to certify the airworthiness of each aircraft. MAX supplier Spirit AeroSystems said it does not expect to return production rate to 52 per month until late 2022. On May 27, Boeing resumed 737 MAX production at a low production rate, with the rate planned to increase towards 31 per month in 2021.
On August 19, Boeing announced that it had received new orders for the 737 MAX for the first time in 2020. Per a statement from the company, Poland's Enter Air SA entered into an agreement to buy up to four 737s. On October 28, Boeing indicated that it expected to deliver about half of the 450 stockpiled aircraft in 2021, and the majority of the remainder in 2022, noting that some of these aircraft will need to be re-marketed and potentially reconfigured. The delivery rate will also condition the production rate for new aircraft, to avoid compounding the problem. In November, Boeing saw more than 1,000 order cancelations since the grounding in March 2019. Some of these already-built aircraft have seen their order canceled and Boeing is working to find new customers to take delivery.

In late January 2022, Boeing's Chief Financial Officer said the 737 program was producing at a rate of 27 aircraft a month and was on track to ramp up the production. On March 4, Boeing reportedly had preliminary plans to ramp up production of the 737 MAX aircraft to about 47 a month by the end of 2023 as the company looked to extend its recovery from successive crises. On July 12, the company said it had met its goal of increasing 737 production to 31 per month when it reported its June order and delivery tally.
In September, however, the company noted that it was regularly having to pause production due to component shortages and other supply chain problems.

In late January 2023, Boeing announced that a fourth production line would open at the Boeing Everett Factory in Everett, Washington. The line will replace the discontinued Boeing 787 line at the factory.

Certification of the MAX 7 and MAX 10 
Following the recertification of the MAX 8 and MAX 9, Boeing resumed work to certify the MAX 7 and MAX 10.

In March 2022, there were rumors that Boeing would request an exemption from the U.S. Aircraft Safety and Certification Reform Act of 2020, a safety reform law passed in response to the MAX crashes. The act requires airliners to be fitted with an engine-indicating and crew-alerting system (EICAS) if type certificated after December 31, 2022. Adding this feature would make the MAX 10 different from other MAX variants, necessitating additional training for pilots.

In November 2022, Boeing announced expected delays to the certification of the MAX 7 and MAX 10, now expected in early 2023 and early 2024 respectively. In December, two proposals to exempt the MAX 7 and MAX 10 from the new requirements were considered for inclusion in a U.S. defense spending bill—one a simple two-year extension to the deadline, the second an exemption for aircraft whose certification applications were submitted before the law was enacted, combined with some equipment changes—but neither proposal was included in the final spending bill. In December 2022, the U.S. Congress agreed on a bill allowing Boeing to certify the MAX 7 and MAX 10 without EICAS, but it must install a third angle-of-attack sensor in all 737 MAX types as previously demanded by European and Canadian regulators. The company also must install a switch to disable the stick shaker, which distracted pilots during the MAX crashes. Boeing would have to retrofit these design changes to all 737 MAXs already delivered in Canada, Europe, and the U.S. within three years of MAX 10 certification.

Replacement airliner 
In November 2014, Boeing talked about developing a clean sheet aircraft to replace the 737. The conceived aircraft was to have a fuselage similar to the 737 though slightly larger, and would make use of the advanced composite technology developed for the 787 Dreamliner. Boeing also considered a parallel development along with the 757 replacement, similar to the development of the 757 and 767 in the 1970s.

Design 
In mid-2011, one design objective was matching fuel burn of the 737 MAX to that of the Airbus A320neo's 15% fuel-burn advantage. The initial 737 MAX reduction was 10–12%; it was later enhanced to 14.5%. The split tip winglet added 1–1.5% fuel burn reduction and a re-lofted tail cone another 1%. Electronically controlling the bleed air system improved efficiency. The new engine nacelle included chevrons, similar to those of the Boeing 787, which also helped to reduce engine noise.

Aerodynamic changes 

The new "split-tip" Advanced Technology (AT) winglet is designed to reduce vortex drag, improving fuel efficiency and maximizing lift while staying in the same ICAO aerodrome reference code letter C gates as current Boeing 737s. It traces its design to the McDonnell Douglas MD-12 1990s twin-deck concept, proposed for similar gate restrictions before the merger with Boeing.

Aviation Partners offers a similar "Split-Tip Scimitar" winglet for previous 737NGs. It resembles a three-way hybrid of a blended winglet, wingtip fence, and raked wingtip.

Other improvements include a re-contoured tail cone, revised auxiliary power unit inlet and exhaust, aft-body vortex generators removal, and other small aerodynamic improvements.

The engines on the 737 MAX were also repositioned, the top of the new engine slightly higher than the top surface of the wing, resulting in a change to the aerodynamic characteristics of the airframe. Due to the aircraft's close proximity to the ground, the larger and more fuel efficient engines did not have enough clearance. As a result, the engines were mounted higher and further forward on the wings, changing the aerodynamic characteristics. The MCAS software based flight control law was implemented to account for the undesirable aerodynamic changes.

Structural and other changes 
The  taller nose-gear strut maintains the same  ground clearance of previous 737 engine nacelles. New struts and nacelles for the heavier engines add bulk, the main landing gear and supporting structure have been reinforced, and fuselage skins are thicker in some places—thus adding  to the MAX 8's empty aircraft weight. To preserve fuel and payload capacity, its maximum takeoff weight is  heavier.

Rockwell Collins was selected to supply four  landscape liquid crystal displays (LCD), as used on the 787, to improve pilots' situation awareness and efficiency. Boeing plans no major modifications for the 737 MAX flight deck, as it wants to maintain commonality with the 737 Next Generation family. Boeing Commercial Airplanes CEO Jim Albaugh said in 2011, that adding more fly-by-wire control systems would be "very minimal". However, the 737 MAX extended spoilers are fly-by-wire controlled. Most of the systems are carried from the 737NG to allow for a short differences-training course to upgrade flight crews.

In addition to the Speed Trim System (STS), the automatic stabilizer control system has been enhanced to include MCAS.  Compared to STS, MCAS has greater authority and cannot be disengaged with the aft and forward column cutout switches. The center console stabilizer-trim cutout switches have been re-wired. Unlike previous versions of the 737, the automatic stabilizer trim control functions cannot be turned off while retaining electric trim switches functionality.

MCAS was deemed necessary by Boeing to meet its internal objective of minimizing training requirements for pilots already qualified on the 737NG. MCAS was to automatically mitigate the pitch-up tendency of the new flight geometry due to the engines being located further forward and higher than on previous 737 models. During a reassessment of the aircraft in February 2020, both FAA and EASA determined that the stability and stall characteristics of the plane would have been acceptable with or without MCAS.

As a production standard, the 737 MAX features the Boeing Sky Interior with overhead bins and LED lighting based on the Boeing 787's interior.

Engines 

In 2011, the CFM LEAP-1B engine was initially 10–12% more efficient than the previous  CFM56-7B of the 737NG. The 18-blade, woven carbon-fiber fan enables a 9:1 bypass ratio (up from 5.1:1 with the previous 24-blade titanium fan) for a 40% smaller noise footprint. The CFM56 bypass ranges from 5.1:1 to 5.5:1. The two-spool design has a low-pressure section comprising the fan and three booster stages driven by five axial turbine stages and a high-pressure section with a 10-stage axial compressor driven by a two-stage turbine.

In November 2011, Boeing selected the larger fan diameter, necessitating a  longer nose landing gear.

The nacelle features chevrons for noise reduction like the 787. A new bleed air digital regulator will improve its reliability. The new nacelles being larger and more forward possess aerodynamic properties which act to further increase the pitch rate. The larger engine is cantilevered ahead of and slightly above the wing, and the laminar flow engine nacelle lipskin is a GKN Aerospace one-piece, spun-formed aluminum sheet inspired by the 787.

Operational history 
After one year of service, 130 MAXs had been delivered to 28 customers, logging over 41,000flights in 118,000hours and flying over 6.5million passengers. Flydubai observed 15% more efficiency than the NG, more than the 14% promised, and dependability reached 99.4%.

In 2019, Moody's had estimated Boeing's operating margin to be  for each 737 MAX 8 at its list price of $121.6 million, although the list price is usually discounted 50–55% in practice. This high margin was made possible by the efficiencies of production volume and the amortization of development costs and capital investment over the decades of the program run. However, costs have since risen significantly and the margin reduced following the two crashes, the FAA grounding, and the severe disruption to production. 
Boeing estimated it would cost an additional $6.3 billion to produce the remaining 737 MAX program, $4 billion for "future abnormal costs" as production restarted, plus an estimated $8.3 billion for concessions and compensation to customers. The rising costs also led Moody's to downgrade Boeing's credit rating.

Variants 
The 737-700, -800 and -900ER, the most widespread versions of the previous 737NG, are succeeded by the 737 MAX 7, MAX 8 and MAX 9, respectively (FAA type certificate: 737-7, -8, and -9). The 737 MAX 8 entered service in May 2017, and the MAX 9 entered service in March 2018. Deliveries for MAX 7 and MAX 200 (a higher-density version of the MAX 8) were initially expected to begin in 2021, and the MAX 10 in 2023.

In February 2018, Boeing forecast that 60–65% of demand for the airliner would be for the 737 MAX 8 variant, 20–25% for the MAX 9 and MAX 10, and 10% for the MAX 7.

737 MAX 7 

Originally based on the 737-700, Boeing announced the redesign of the MAX 7, derived from the MAX 8, at the July 2016 Farnborough Air Show, accommodating two more seat rows than the 737-700 for 138 seats, up by 12 seats. The redesign uses the 737-8 wing and landing gear; a pair of over-wing exits rather than the single-door configuration; a 46-inch longer aft fuselage and a 30-inch longer forward fuselage; structural re-gauging and strengthening; and systems and interior modifications to accommodate the longer length. It is to fly  farther than the -700 with 18% lower fuel costs per seat. Boeing predicts the MAX 7 to carry 12 more passengers  farther than A319neo with 7 percent lower operating costs per seat.

Production on the first  wing spar for the 737-7 began in October 2017. Assembly of the first flight-test aircraft began on November 22, 2017 and was rolled out of the factory on February 5, 2018. The MAX 7 took off for its first flight on March 16, 2018, from the factory in Renton, Washington, and flew for three hours over Washington state.

Entry into service with launch operator Southwest Airlines was originally expected in January 2019. WestJet also converted its order for MAX 7s, originally due for delivery in 2019, into MAX 8s, not expecting to take any MAX 7s until at least 2021. In March 2021 Southwest placed an order for 100 MAX 7s, and exercised options for another 34 in 2021, bringing their total orders to 234; WestJet had 22. in July 2022, Southwest announced that it did not expect to receive any MAX 7 aircraft until 2023 due to the ongoing certification delays and that it would instead take delivery of MAX 8 aircraft in the interim. That same November, Boeing announced that it expects MAX 7 certification in early 2023.

737 MAX 8 

The first variant developed in the 737 MAX series, the MAX 8 replaces the 737-800 with a longer fuselage than the MAX 7. On July 23, 2013, Boeing completed the firm configuration for the 737 MAX 8. The MAX 8 has a lower empty weight and higher maximum takeoff weight than the A320neo.

The Boeing 737 MAX 8 completed its first flight test in La Paz, Bolivia. The  altitude at El Alto International Airport tested the MAX's capability to take off and land at high altitudes. Its first commercial flight was operated by Malindo Air on May 22, 2017, between Kuala Lumpur and Singapore as Flight OD803. In early 2017, a new -8 was valued at $52.85million, rising to below $54.5million by mid2018.

737 MAX 200 

In September 2014, Boeing launched a high-density version of the 737 MAX 8, the 737 MAX 200, named for seating for up to 200 passengers in a single-class high-density configuration with slimline seats; an extra pair of exit doors is required because of the higher passenger capacity. Boeing states that this version would be 20% more cost-efficient per seat than current 737 models, and would be the most efficient narrow-body on the market when delivered, including 5% lower operating costs than the 737 MAX 8. Three of eight galley trolleys are removed to accommodate more passenger space. An order with Ryanair for 100 aircraft was finalized in December 2014.

In mid-November 2018, the first of then 135 ordered by Ryanair rolled out, in a 197-seat configuration. It was first flown from Renton on January 13, 2019, and was due to enter service in April 2019, with another four MAX 200s expected later in 2019, though certification and deliveries were deferred while the MAX was grounded. In November 2019, Ryanair informed its pilots that, due to an unspecified design issue with the additional over-wing exit doors, it did not expect to receive any MAX 200s until late April or early May 2020. The high-density variant was certified by the FAA on March 31, 2021. Ryanair took delivery of its first 8–200 in June 2021.

Besides launch customer Ryanair, other customers include International Airlines Group and low-cost airlines Akasa Air of India, Allegiant Air of the United States, Arajet of the Dominican Republic and Vietnam's VietJet.

Proposed 737-8ERX 

737 MAX 9 

The 737 MAX 9 will replace the 737-900 and has a longer fuselage than the MAX 8. Lion Air was the launch customer with an order for 201 in February 2012. It made its roll-out on March 7, 2017, and first flight on April 13, 2017; it took off from Renton Municipal Airport and landed at Boeing Field after a 2 hr 42 min flight. It was presented at the 2017 Paris Air Show.

Boeing 737-9 flight tests were scheduled to run through 2017, with 30% of the -8 tests repeated; aircraft 1D001 was used for auto-land, avionics, flutter, and mostly stability-and-control trials, while 1D002 was used for environment control system testing. It was certified by February 2018. Asian low-cost carrier Lion Air Group took delivery of the first on March 21, 2018, before entering service with Thai Lion Air. As the competing A321neo attracts more orders, the sale value of a 737-9 is the same as a 2018 737-8 at $53million.

737 MAX 10 
To compete with the Airbus A321neo, loyal customers, such as Korean Air and United Airlines, pressed Boeing to develop a variant larger than the MAX 9, of which Boeing revealed studies in early 2016. As the Airbus A321neo had outsold the MAX 9 five-to-one, the proposed MAX 10 included a larger engine, stronger wings, and telescoping landing gear in mid-2016.

The modest stretch of the MAX 10 enables the aircraft to retain the existing wing, and the Leap 1B engine from the MAX 9 with a trailing-link main landing gear as the only major change. Boeing 737 MAX Vice President and General Manager Keith Leverkuhn said the design had to be frozen in 2018, for a 2020 introduction.

Boeing hopes that 737 operators and 737 MAX customers like United Airlines, Delta Air Lines, Alaska Airlines, Air Canada, Lion Air, and Chinese airlines will be interested in the new variant. Boeing predicts a 5% lower trip cost and seat cost compared to the A321neo. Air Lease Corporation wants it a year sooner; its CEO John Pleuger stated "It would have been better to get the first airplane in March 2019, but I don't think that's possible". AerCap CEO Aengus Kelly is cautious and said the -9 and -10 "will cannibalize each other".

The 737 MAX 10 was launched on June 19, 2017, with 240 orders and commitments from more than ten customers. United Airlines will be the largest 737 MAX 10 customer, converting 100 of their 161 orders for the MAX 9 into orders for the MAX 10. Boeing ended the 2017 Paris Air Show with 361 orders and commitments, including 214 conversions, from 16 customers, including 50 orders from Lion Air.

The variant configuration was firmed up by February 2018, and by mid-2018, the critical design review was completed. , assembly was underway with a first flight planned for late 2019. The semi-levered landing gear design has a telescoping oleo-pneumatic strut with a down-swinging lever to permit  taller gear. Driven by the existing retraction system, a shrink-link mechanical linkage mechanism at the top of the leg, inspired by carrier aircraft designs, allows the gear to be drawn in and shortened while being retracted into the existing wheel well. Entry into service is slated for July 2020.

On November 22, 2019, Boeing unveiled the first MAX 10 to employees in its Renton factory, Washington, scheduled for the first flight in 2020. The MAX 10 has similar capacity as the A321XLR, but shorter range and much poorer field performance, greatly hindering its potential to service smaller airports as compared to the A321XLR.

By early 2021, Boeing expected 737 MAX 10 deliveries to start in 2023. The variant made its maiden flight on June 18, 2021, initiating its flight test and certification program.

On June 29, 2021, United Airlines placed an order for another 150 of the Boeing 737 MAX 10. These MAX 10s will replace a large number of United's older Boeing 757-200s.

In September 2021, Ryanair failed to reach an agreement with Boeing over an order of MAX 10s, citing cost as a primary concern.

In November 2022, Boeing Commercial Airplanes CEO Stanley Deal told investors at a conference that the MAX 10 was expected to enter service in 2024.

Boeing Business Jet 
The BBJ MAX 8 and BBJ MAX 9 are proposed business jet variants of the 737 MAX 8 and 9, with new CFM LEAP-1B engines and advanced winglets providing 13% better fuel burn than the Boeing Business Jet; the BBJ MAX 8 will have a  range, and the BBJ MAX 9 a  range. The BBJ MAX 7 was unveiled in October 2016, with a  range and 10% lower operating costs than the original BBJ, while being larger.

Operators 
, the five largest operators of the Boeing 737 MAX were Southwest Airlines (69), Ryanair (55), American Airlines (42), Air Canada (32), and China Southern Airlines (24).

Orders and deliveries 

American Airlines was the first disclosed customer. By November 17, 2011, there were 700 commitments from nine customers, including Lion Air and SMBC Aviation Capital. By December 2011, the 737 MAX had 948 commitments and firm orders from thirteen customers. On September 8, 2014, Ryanair agreed to 100 firm orders with 100 options. In January 2017, aircraft leasing company GECAS ordered 75. By January 2019 the 737 MAX had 5,011 firm orders from 78 identified customers, with the top three being Southwest Airlines with 280, flydubai with 251, and Lion Air with 251. The first 737 MAX 8 was delivered to Malindo Air on May 16, 2017.

Following the groundings in March 2019, Boeing suspended all deliveries of 737 MAX aircraft, reduced production from 52 to 42 aircraft per month, and on December 16, 2019, announced that production would be suspended from January 2020 to conserve cash. At the time of the grounding, the 737 MAX had 4,636 unfilled orders valued at an estimated $600billion. Boeing produced over 450 MAX aircraft awaiting delivery, about half of which are expected to be delivered in 2021, and the majority of the remainder in 2022. By November 30, 2020, at the time of the ungrounding, the unfilled orders stood at 4,039 aircraft. In November 2021, during the Dubai Airshow, Boeing received 72 firm orders from a new 737 MAX customer, India based Akasa Air, to be fulfilled over a 4-year period with first delivery in June 2022.  In late January 2022 Boeing was working to clear the remaining inventory of 335 MAX aircraft and estimated most of them would be delivered by the end of 2023. In December 2022, the 1000th 737 MAX was delivered. 

, the 737 MAX has 4,246 unfilled orders and 1,068 deliveries.

Accidents and incidents 

Between March 2017 and March 2019, the global fleet of 387 aircraft operated 500,000 flights and experienced two fatal crashes, having an accident rate of four accidents per million flights, whereas the previous Boeing 737 generations averaged 0.2 accidents per one million flights.

Lion Air Flight 610 

On October 29, 2018, Lion Air Flight 610, a 737 MAX 8, plunged into the Java Sea 13 minutes after takeoff from Soekarno–Hatta International Airport, Jakarta, Indonesia. The flight was a scheduled domestic flight to Depati Amir Airport, Pangkal Pinang, Indonesia. All 189 people on board died. This was the first fatal aviation crash and first hull loss of a 737 MAX. The aircraft had been delivered to Lion Air two months earlier. People familiar with the investigation reported that during a flight piloted by a different crew on the day before the crash, the same aircraft experienced a similar malfunction but an extra pilot sitting in the cockpit jumpseat correctly diagnosed the problem and told the crew how to disable the malfunctioning MCAS flight-control system.  Indonesia's National Transportation Safety Committee released its final report into the crash on October 25, 2019, attributing the crash to the MCAS pushing the aircraft into a dive due to data from a faulty angle-of-attack sensor. Following the Lion Air crash, Boeing issued an operational manual guidance, advising airlines on how to address erroneous cockpit readings.

Ethiopian Airlines Flight 302 

On March 10, 2019, Ethiopian Airlines Flight 302, a 737 MAX 8, crashed approximately six minutes after takeoff from Addis Ababa, Ethiopia, on a scheduled flight to Nairobi, Kenya, killing all 149 passengers and 8 crew members on board. The aircraft was four months old at the time. The cause of the crash was initially unclear, though the aircraft's vertical speed after takeoff was reported to be unstable. Evidence retrieved on the crash site suggests, that at the time of the crash, the aircraft was configured to dive, similar to Lion Air Flight 610. On April 4, Ethiopian transport minister Dagmawit Moges stated that the crew "performed all the procedures repeatedly provided by the manufacturer but was not able to control the aircraft."

The similarity of the physical and flight data evidence from the accidents led to the global 737 MAX groundings beginning on the day of the second accident.

Specifications

See also 

 Financial impact of the Boeing 737 MAX groundings

References

Further reading

External links 

 
 
 

Aircraft first flown in 2016
737 MAX
Low-wing aircraft
Twinjets
2010s United States airliners